Louisa Eva Gould (7 October 1891 – February 1945) was a Jersey shopkeeper and a member of the British resistance movement in the Channel Islands during World War II. From 1942 until her arrest in 1944, Gould sheltered an escaped Soviet slave worker known as Feodor Polycarpovitch Burriy on the island of Jersey. Following a trial, she was sent to the Ravensbrück concentration camp where she was gassed to death in 1945. In 2010 she was posthumously named a British Hero of the Holocaust.

Life
Gould was born Louisa Eva Le Druillenec in St Ouen, Jersey, on 7 October 1891. For most of her life she ran a grocery store at La Fontaine, Millais in St Ouen.

Gould had two sons, Ralph and Edward, both of whom enlisted in the British armed forces during World War II. Edward, an officer in the Royal Navy Volunteer Reserve, was killed in action in 1941.

Resistance
During the World War II occupation of the Channel Islands, the Nazis used captured Russian soldiers as slave workers. 
Beginning in late 1942, Gould hid Fyodr Polycarpovitch Burriy, an escaped Soviet slave and former pilot who had been captured after his aircraft had been shot down. Aware of the severe penalties for harbouring enemies of the Germans, Gould said simply "I have to do something for another mother's son." Gould hid Burriy inside her St. Ouen home for 18 months.

Arrest, trial and death
A neighbour later reported that Gould was harbouring Burriy, whom she called "Bill." In June 1944, the German forces searched her house. While they did not find Burriy, they found a scrap of paper that had been used as a Christmas gift tag, addressed to Burriy, and a Russian-English dictionary that he had used for practising his English. Burriy managed to avoid capture during the search and until the end of the war.

Gould was arrested by the Nazis and charged. At trial she was sentenced to two years in prison for harbouring Burriy, and for the possession of a radio which she had kept despite regulations requiring her to hand it in. Arrested with her were her brother Harold Le Druillenec, and her sister Ivy Forster.

Following her trial, Gould was sent to the Ravensbrück concentration camp. Her brother Harold Le Druillenec was sent to the Bergen-Belsen concentration camp, and would be one of only two British survivors. Louisa Gould was gassed to death in February 1945 at Ravensbrück, 2 months before liberation.

Recognition
In 1995 a memorial plaque was unveiled in St Ouen, Jersey; Burriy, the former Russian slave, attended its unveiling.  In 2010 she was posthumously named a British Hero of the Holocaust. Gould's story is depicted in the 2017 film Another Mother's Son by Jenny Seagrove.

References 

1891 births
1945 deaths
People from Saint Ouen, Jersey
British people who died in Nazi concentration camps
People who died in Ravensbrück concentration camp
British women in World War II
British civilians killed in World War II
People killed by gas chamber by Nazi Germany